Châtelet Les Halles is a 2000 album recorded by French singer Florent Pagny. It was his sixth studio album and his eighth album oversall. Released on 7 November 2000, it achieved huge success in France where it remained charted for 80 weeks, including a peak at the top for one week. It was also successful in Belgium (Wallonia). It provided three singles, but a sole top ten hit: "Et un jour, une femme" (#5 in France, #2 in Belgium), "Châtelet Les Halles" (#45 in France) and "Terre" (#37 in France). French singers Calogero, Pascal Obispo, David Hallyday and Art Mengo participated in the writing or the composing of at least one song of the album.

Track listing
 "Châtelet Les Halles" (Lionel Florence) — 5:08
 "Comment je saurai" (Golemanas, Seff) — 4:55
 "Y'a pas un homme qui soit né pour ça" (Florence, Guirao, Pascal Obispo) — 3:58
 "Un Mot de Prévert" (Falcao, Florence, Marie, Melville) — 3:25
 "L'air du temps" (Calogero, Florence) — 3:35
 "Les Ombres" (Chemouny, Hallyday) — 4:19
 "La Solitude" (Presgurvic) — 5:05
 "Et un jour, une femme" (Florence, Obispo) — 5:20
 "Dix Choses" (Esteve, Art Mengo) — 4:05
 "Terre" (Dupont, Marrier, Raffaëlli) — 4:18
 "Le temps joue contre nous" (Hampartzoumian, Veneruso) — 4:12
 "La légende de Carlos Gardel" (Chemouny, Hallyday) — 4:48
 "Quelques mots" (Hampartzoumian, Veneruso) — 3:41

Source : Allmusic.

Charts

Certifications and sales

Releases

References

2000 albums
Florent Pagny albums